Laudoha is a village in the Faridpur Durgapur CD block in the Durgapur subdivision of the Paschim Bardhaman district in the state of the West Bengal, India.

Geography

Urbanisation
According to the 2011 census, 79.22% of the population of the Durgapur subdivision was urban and 20.78% was rural. The Durgapur subdivision has 1 municipal corporation at Durgapur and 38 (+1 partly) census towns  (partly presented in the map alongside; all places marked on the map are linked in the full-screen map).

Civic administration

Police station
Faridpur police station, located on Ukhra-Madaiganj Road, in Laudoha gram panchayat, has jurisdiction over parts of the Faridpur Durgapur CD block. The area covered is 106.56 km2 and the population covered is 94,603.

CD block HQ
The headquarters of the Faridpur Durgapur CD block are located at Laudoha.

Demographics
According to the 2011 Census of India, Laudoha had a total population of 2,399, of which 1,232 (51%) were males and 1,167 (49%) were females. Population in the age range 0-6 years was 257. The total number of literate persons in Laudoha was 1,660 (77.50% of the population over 6 years).

*For language details see Faridpur Durgapur#Language and religion

Education
Laudoha K.T.B. Institution is a Bengali-medium coeducational institution established in 1963. It has facilities for teaching from class V to class XII. The school has 12 computers, a library with 2,000 books and a playground.

Kalipur High School is a Bengali-medium coeducational institution established in 1907. It has facilities for teaching from class V to class X.

Healthcare
Laudoha Rural Hospital, with 30 beds, at Laudoha, is the major government medical facility in the  Faridpur Durgapur CD block. There are primary health centres at Lowapur, PO Ichhapur (with 6 beds) and Kantaberia, PO Dhabani (with 10 beds).

References

Villages in Paschim Bardhaman district